The following people have served as presidents of Brigham Young University and principals of Brigham Young Academy, which split to become Brigham Young University and Brigham Young High School in 1903.  This list does not include presidents of Brigham Young University-Hawaii or Brigham Young University–Idaho.

External links
List of BYU presidents on the school's website

References

 
Brigham Young